Coyote is an unincorporated community in Lincoln County, New Mexico, United States.

References

Unincorporated communities in Lincoln County, New Mexico
Unincorporated communities in New Mexico